Industrial resources (minerals) are geological materials that are mined for their commercial value, which are not fuel (fuel minerals or mineral fuels) and are not sources of metals (metallic minerals) but are used in the industries based on their physical and/or chemical properties.
They are used in their natural state or after beneficiation either as raw materials or as additives in a wide range of applications.

Examples and applications
Typical examples of industrial rocks and minerals are limestone, clays, sand, gravel, diatomite, kaolin, bentonite, silica, barite, gypsum, and talc.
Some examples of applications for industrial minerals are construction, ceramics, paints, electronics, filtration, plastics, glass, detergents and paper.

In some cases, even organic materials (peat) and industrial products or by-products (cement, slag, silica fume) are categorized under industrial minerals, as well as metallic compounds mainly utilized in non-metallic form (as an example most titanium is utilized as an oxide TiO2  rather than Ti metal).

The evaluation of raw materials to determine their suitability for use as industrial minerals requires technical test-work, mineral processing trials and end-product evaluation; free to download evaluation manuals are available for the following industrial minerals: limestone, flake graphite, diatomite, kaolin, bentonite and construction materials. These are available from the British Geological Survey external link 'Industrial Minerals in BGS' with regular industry news and reports published in Industrial Minerals magazine.

List of industrial minerals by name
Aggregates
Alunite
Asbestos
Asphalt, Natural
Ball clays
Baryte
Bentonite / Diatomite / Fuller's earth
Borates
Brines
Carbonatites
Corundum
Diamond
Dimension stone
Feldspar and Nepheline - Syenite
Fluorspar
Garnet
Gem mineral
Granite
Graphite
Gypsum
Halite
Kaolin
Kyanite / Sillimanite / Andalusite
Limestone / Dolomite
Marble
Mica
Mirabilite
Natron
Nahcolite
Novaculite
Olivine
Perlite
Phosphate
Potash –Potassium minerals
Pumice
Quartz
Slate
Silica sand / Tripoli
Sulfur
Talc
Vermiculite
Wollastonite
Zeolites

See also
List of minerals
List of minerals recognized by the International Mineralogical Association
Industrial Minerals, magazine
Mineral industry
Minerals

References

External links

Industrial Minerals Association - North America
The "chessboard" classification scheme of mineral deposits (abstract) 

Minerals
Economic geology